is a Japanese popular music artist and producer. His 1992 single "+ OR -" hit the Billboard charts in Japan at number 5 in October 1992. After Unicorn dissolved in 1994, he started his solo career.

Discography

Singles
 "+ OR -" (12 September 1992)
 "Yokubo" (21 May 1994)
 "Boku no Yukue" (2 November 1994)
 "Suima" (21 June 1995)
 "Gemusetto" (22 November 1995)

Albums
 A (2 November 1994)
 Wildfire (13 December 1995)

References

External links
 abedon the company - The official website
Yoshiharu Abe Interview NAMM Oral History Library (2006)

1966 births
Japanese keyboardists
Japanese pop musicians
Japanese record producers
Living people
Musicians from Yamagata Prefecture
People from Yamagata Prefecture
Unicorn (Japanese band) members